Stewart Hall (originally Mull Hall) is a cultural centre and art gallery in Pointe-Claire, Quebec, Canada.

Originally built as a private mansion, today Stewart Hall houses a cultural centre, a reading and reference room, an art gallery, and a community centre.

History
Mull Hall was constructed for Charles Wesley MacLean in 1915–16 to plans by architect Robert Findlay. The house was named for the Isle of Mull, which was home of the Clan MacLean in the Scottish Highlands.

The Fathers of Sainte-Croix acquired the mansion in 1940, and continued to operate the farm on the surrounding land.

In 1958, the Fathers of Sainte-Croix sold the land to a real estate developer who had planned to build a high-rise apartment building on the site. The land was soon after purchased by Walter and May Stewart, who donated it to the city of Pointe-Claire in exchange for $1.

The city of Pointe-Claire turned the building into a cultural centre, which was inaugurated on February 16, 1963.

Architecture
The exterior walls of the house are made from locally sourced limestone blocks. The building's design is symmetrical, and consists of thirty five rooms. A large veranda overlooks Lake Saint Louis.

References

External links
Stewart Hall Cultural Centre
Stewart Hall Art Gallery

Buildings and structures in Pointe-Claire
Art museums and galleries in Quebec
1963 establishments in Canada
Art museums established in 1963
Buildings and structures completed in 1916
Houses in Montreal
Robert Findlay buildings
Limestone buildings